Dmitri Anatolyevich Kuznetsov (born 14 August 1972, died 1 July 2021) was a Russian professional footballer.

Club career
He made his professional debut in the Russian Premier League in 1992 for FC Torpedo Moscow.

Honours
 Russian Cup winner: 1993.

References

1972 births
2021 deaths
Footballers from Moscow
Soviet footballers
Russian footballers
Russia under-21 international footballers
Association football midfielders
FC Torpedo Moscow players
FC Torpedo-2 players
FC Arsenal Tula players
FC Khimki players
FC Metallurg Lipetsk players
Russian Premier League players
FC Volga Ulyanovsk players